Vincentius Aloysius (Ed) Groot (born 26 December 1957 in Grootebroek) is a Dutch politician and former journalist, columnist and civil servant. As a member of the Labour Party (Partij van de Arbeid) he was an MP between 17 June 2010 and 23 March 2017. He focused on matters of taxes, government spending and finances.

References

External links 
  House of Representatives biography

1957 births
Living people
Dutch civil servants
Dutch columnists
Dutch journalists
Labour Party (Netherlands) politicians
Members of the House of Representatives (Netherlands)
People from Stede Broec
21st-century Dutch politicians